Cayon Rockets are a football club based in Cayon in Saint Kitts and Nevis.

History
They won their country's football championship in 2001/02, thus becoming the first club from outside Basseterre to do so. They were relegated from the Saint Kitts Premier Division in 2006/07. The club previously played home matches at St Mary's Park.

Achievements
Saint Kitts and Nevis Premier Division: 3
 2001–02, 2015–16, 2016–17

Saint Kitts and Nevis National Cup: 2
 2001–02, 2017–18

References

Football clubs in Saint Kitts and Nevis